See also Turiec (Sajó).

The Turiec is a river in north-western Slovakia. It is a tributary to the Váh, into which it flows near the city of Martin. Its source is in the Veľká Fatra Mountains. The Turiec region is named after this river.

Etymology
Pliny the Elder associated the name with Durius (the ancient name of Upper Váh), Ptolemy with the Celtic Taurisci tribe. The name is probably derived from the Indo-European appellative tur-. The root is used also in a broad sense - "rich" or "strong". The Hungarian name Turóc comes from the ancient Slavic form Turъcь (1113 Turc).

Fauna 
There were recorded 18 species of molluscs in Turiec river. That includes 8 species of freshwater gastropods and 10 species of freshwater bivalves.

References 

Rivers of Slovakia